Parasaissetia is a genus of scales and mealybugs in the family Coccidae. There are about five described species in Parasaissetia.

Species
 Parasaissetia ficicola De Lotto, 1965
 Parasaissetia litorea De Lotto, 1967
 Parasaissetia nairobica (De Lotto, 1957)
 Parasaissetia nigra (Nietner, 1861)
 Parasaissetia tsaratananae (Mamet, 1951)

References

Further reading

 
 
 
 

Sternorrhyncha genera
Coccidae